Rozvadov is a municipality and village in Tachov District in the Plzeň Region of the Czech Republic. It has about 700 inhabitants.

Administrative parts

Villages of Diana, Milíře, Nové Domky, Rozcestí and Svatá Kateřina are administrative parts of Rozvadov.

Geography
It lies in the central part of the Upper Palatine Forest.

History
The first written mention of Rozvadov is from 1581. The customs office is first mentioned in 1613. The current customhouse is a building from 1934.

Before the expulsion of Germans in the wake of World War II, the municipality had a German-speaking majority.

Economy
King's Casino Rozvadov is located here and as of 2021, it contains the largest poker room in Europe.

Transport
Rozvadov is known for its important road border crossing with Germany Rozvadov / Waidhaus, located on the D5 motorway.

References

External links

Villages in Tachov District
Czech Republic–Germany border crossings